= Alveolar lateral approximant (disambiguation) =

An alveolar lateral approximant is a speech sound, but the term is ambiguous and can refer to the following:

- Voiceless alveolar lateral approximant [l̥]
- Voiced alveolar lateral approximant [l]
